Jesus de Miguel (9 January 1975) is a prominent: Spanish artist, closer to the neo expressionist style born in Palencia, Spain.

Biography
He graduated in Fine Arts at the University of Salamanca in 1999 after having studied also Anthropology of Art at the same university. He has been Art Director of Flower Power since 2000. Flower Power is the artistic and musical initiative that has been held in Pachá for more than 30 years.
In 2000 with his partner Al Velilla he released his own label Modern Electrics. They have boosted the work of electronic music artists such as Nacho Marco, Jay Tripwire and Kiko Navarro.
Its many facets range from sculpture, to musical creation, 3D animation, video art, and installation art, with styles taken from dadaism, comics, punk, collage and even prehistoric paintings. Allen Jones the famous British artist, member of the Royal Academy of Arts, commented on Jesus de Miguel, after attending his exhibition at Think Creative Hub
"He is an artist who uses different pictorial expressions in an exceptional way. It is very difficult to make such a large individual exhibition and, at the same time, to be so homogeneous and complete. Bravo!"

Solo Shows 

 2000 Rockymarcianoseretira in the Istituto Europeo di Design 
 2002 Grial, Ibiza.
 2005 Psycolabis Pachá Hotel, Ibiza. 
 2006 Silly short films. Video sample. La Nave, Ibiza 
 2007-2009 Artistic Direction and Video Installations in Home Video Festival Ibiza, HOVI
 2007-2010 Miguel E. Young Art Gallery. Ibiza                           
 2010-2011 Club Roca Llisa, Ibiza
 2011 Exhibitions Hall at Can Jeroni, Ibiza.
 2013 Storm and Tide, Madrid
 2014 Pictures & MAD furniture at La Maison, Ibiza 
 2015 Think Creative Hub, Ibiza
 2015 Universal White Glue Club Diario de Ibiza, Ibiza
 2016 Art Exhibition in Casa Portmany. Dalt Vila, Ibiza
 2017 Es polvorí. Dalt Vila, Ibiza.
 2017 Continuous unnecessary information B12 Gallery, Ibiza.
 2018 Solo Show at SushiPoint, Ibiza
 2018 Qué pinto aquí. Individual Exhibition. Velázquez, 12, Madrid

Living Art 

 July, 2nd 2017: Creating some paintings by “four hands” with artist Robert Arató.
 July, 13th 2017: Tribute to the Beat Generation in the 'Flower Power Beat Experience Festival', with the collaboration of the French artist Silvio Magaglio.

References

External links and references
 Jesus de Miguel exhibits his paintings during P Art Ibiza Gallery 4th Anniversary, 2017
 Jesus de Miguel and his poetical artwork, 2016
 XXL Art Project, 2012
 Ibiza Style Magazine. Enero 2012. Cover and pages 38-39.
 Interviewed in Ibiza Style TV. February, 2012
 One Ibiza, Art Gallery
 Label: Modern Electrics
 Official Website of the artist

University of Salamanca alumni
21st-century Spanish painters
Spanish male painters
Modern sculptors
Modern painters
21st-century Spanish sculptors
Spanish male sculptors
Pop artists
Spanish contemporary artists
1975 births
Living people
21st-century Spanish male artists